Rinka may refer to:

People with the given name
John Rinka, (1948) American college basketball player 
Silvia Rinka, (1962) East German swimmer
Rinka (model), Japanese fashion model
Rinka Duijndam,(1997) Dutch handballer
, Japanese figure skater

Places
Rinka Falls, a waterfall in the Logar Valley, northern Slovenia

Other uses
Rinka, a dog belonging to Norman Scott, shot in a bungled murder attempt

Japanese feminine given names